Chelatococcus caeni is a Gram-negative, non-spore-forming, rod-shaped and motile bacterium from the genus of Chelatococcus which has been isolated from biofilm reactor sludge in Korea.

References

Hyphomicrobiales
Bacteria described in 2015